Abdul Jamil Tajik is a Pakistani American physician and medical investigator in the field of cardiovascular diseases. He is listed by the Institute for Scientific Information as a highly cited researcher – one of the top 250 researchers in his field in terms of number of citations.

Positions
Dr. A. Jamil Tajik is currently the Director of the Aurora Cardiac Specialty Center specializing in the following areas: Adult Congenital Heart Disease, Hypertrophic Cardiomyopathy, Valvular Heart Disease, Marfan Disease and Aorthopathies and Pericardial Disorders. https://www.aurorahealthcare.org/locations/clinic/cardiac-specialty-centers-2801-w-kinnickinnic-river-pkwy-mob-2-ste-530.

He is the former President of Aurora Cardiovascular Services, Aurora St. Luke’s Medical Center in Milwaukee, Wisconsin. Dr. A. Jamil Tajik is the Thomas J. Watson, Jr., Professor Emeritus in honor of Dr. Robert L. Frye and Chairman Emeritus of Zayed Cardiovascular Center, Mayo Clinic, Rochester, MN.

Medical Degree
Dr. A. Jamil Tajik received his medical degree from King Edward Medical College Lahore, Pakistan in 1965 and completed Residency and Fellowship in Cardiology at the Mayo Graduate School of Medicine.  In 1972, he was appointed as a consultant in Cardiovascular Diseases at Mayo Clinic, Rochester, MN. Where he became the Director of the Echocardiography Laboratory from 1980 - 1992 and Chairman of the Cardiovascular Division from 1993 - 2002. He joined Aurora Health Care in Wisconsin in 2010.

Associated organisations
Dr. A. Jamil Tajik is an active member of professional societies and organization including the American Heart Association (AHA), American College of Cardiology (ACC), American Society of Electrocardiography (ASE), International Society of Cardiovascular Ultrasound (ISCU) and Heart Valve Society of America (HVSA). He served as the Chairman of Electrocardiography Committees for both the AHA and ACC. He was the Chairman of the ACC's International Committee from 2001-2006. He is a member of the Editorial Board of 10 prestigious cardiology journals.

Interests
Dr. A. Jamil Tajik has a passion for teaching.  He was named “Teacher of the Year” by the Mayo Cardiovascular Fellows on five occasions and received the prestigious Melvin L. Marcus Memorial Award for distinguished contributions as “Gifted Teacher in Cardiology” in 2000.  He has been the director/co-director of a large number of cardiology courses including 25 programs at the ACC Learning Center “Heart House” and 50 American College of Cardiology/American Society of Echo extramural courses.  He also co-directed international courses in Germany, Austria, Switzerland, Spain, Italy, Turkey, Kuwait, Egypt, Pakistan and UAE.  Dr. Tajik was the Director and permanent host of the award-winning tele-education program “Cardiology Today and Tomorrow”. 

His major areas of patient care, teaching and research include imaging, adult congenital heart disease, hypertrophic cardiomyopathies, valvular heart disease, pericardial diseases, marfan disease and aortopathies and diastolic heart failure.  Dr. Tajik also has a special interest in preventative cardiology and was the driving force behind a countywide (Olmsted County, MN, U.S.A.) prevention project called Cardiovision 2020.  His bibliography to date includes over 600 articles and book chapters.  He has also co-authored seven books.  Dr. Tajik holds several U.S. patents on ultrasound catheter-based technology.  He presented the prestigious Edler Lecture at the American Society of Echocardiography in 2000 and the Herrick Lecture at the American Heart Association meeting in Illinois in 2000.  He presented the Euro Echo Lecture in 2001, the Bishop Lecture at the American College of Cardiology meeting in 2003, the Population Sciences Lecture at the annual European Society of Cardiology meeting in 2004, Modena Lecture and Morgagni Lecture at the Italian International Congress in 2005 at the Italian Cardiac Society, the Hagege Lecture at the French Society of Cardiology in 2006, the William Harvey Lecture at the University of Padova, Italy in 2007, the State-of-the-Art lecture at the Annual Japanese Circulation Society meeting in 2009 and the Hans Hecht Lecture at the University of Chicago in 2010.

Awards
Dr. A. Jamil Tajik has received awards and special recognitions including the Distinguished Alumnus Award presented by the King Edward Medical College Alumni Association (North America) in 2000.  He received the Medal of Merit in 2001 from the International Society for Heart Research.  He was named the Distinguished Fellow of the American College of Cardiology in 2003.  He also received the Echo Pioneer Award in 2003.  Dr. Tajik was presented the Medal of Excellence by His Majesty the late King Hussein of Jordan in 1996.  He was inducted as an Honorary Fellow in the Hungarian Cardiac Society in 2003, Mexican Cardiac Society and the Italian Cardiac Societies in 2005 and Japanese College of Cardiology in 2008.  He received the prestigious Ellis Island Medal of Honor Award in 2005.  He was elected as a Fellow of the International Academy of Cardiovascular Sciences in July 2005.  He was an invited participant in the Clinton Global Initiative Conference in September 2005.  He received the Mayo Clinic Department of Medicine Outstanding Mentorship Award in 2005.  An Annual Tajik-Seward Echo Lectureship was established in 2006 by Mayo colleagues.  Japanese Society of Echocardiography honored him by establishing the Annual A. Jamil Tajik Young Investigator Award in 2008.  Dr. Tajik received the “Lifetime Achievement Award” of the American Society of Echo in June 2009.

Personal life
Dr. A. Jamil Tajik is married to the former Zeest Sheikh of Lahore, Pakistan, and they are the parents of five.  Their hobby is traveling. His favorite granddaughter is Roxanne.

References

External links
 https://www.aurorahealthcare.org/doctors/dr-a-jamil-tajik-md
 https://www.aurorahealthcare.org/locations/clinic/cardiac-specialty-centers-2801-w-kinnickinnic-river-pkwy-mob-2-ste-530
 http://www.aurorastlukes.org/

American physicians of Pakistani descent
Pakistani emigrants to the United States
Pakistani people of Tajik descent
Year of birth missing (living people)
Living people
University of the Punjab alumni
American medical researchers
King Edward Medical University alumni